"Public enemy" is a term which was first widely used in the United States in the 1930s to describe individuals whose activities were seen as criminal and extremely damaging to society, though the phrase had been used for centuries to describe pirates, vikings, highwaymen, bandits, mobsters, and similar outlaws.

Origin and usage
The expression dates back to Roman times.<ref>see also Jal, Paul (1963) [http://www.persee.fr/doc/rea_0035-2004_1963_num_65_1_3689 Hostis (publicus) dans la littérature latine de la fin de la République], footnotes 1 and 2</ref> 
The Senate declared emperor Nero a hostis publicus in AD 68. Its direct translation is "public enemy". Whereas "public" is currently used in English in order to describe something related to collectivity at large, with an implication towards government or the State, the Latin word "publicus" could, in addition to that meaning, also refer directly to people, making it the equivalent of the genitive of populus ("people"), populi ("popular" or "of the people"). Thus, "public enemy" and "enemy of the people" are, etymologically, near-synonyms.

The words "ennemi du peuple''" were extensively used during the French revolution. On 25 December 1793, Robespierre stated: "The revolutionary government owes to the good citizen all the protection of the nation; it owes nothing to the Enemies of the People but death". The Law of 22 Prairial in 1794 extended the remit of the Revolutionary Tribunal to punish "enemies of the people", with some political crimes punishable by death, including "spreading false news to divide or trouble the people".

The modern use of the term was first popularized in April 1930 by Frank J. Loesch, then chairman of the Chicago Crime Commission, in an attempt to publicly denounce Al Capone and other organized crime gangsters.

In 1933, Loesch recounted the origin and purpose of the list:

All of those listed were reputed to be gangsters or racketeers and most were rum-running bootleggers. Although all were known to be consistent law breakers (most prominently in regard to the widely broken Eighteenth Amendment to the United States Constitution banning alcohol), none of those named were fugitives or were actively wanted by the law. The list's purpose was clearly to shame those named and to encourage authorities to prosecute them.

The phrase was later appropriated by J. Edgar Hoover and the FBI, who used it to describe various notorious fugitives they were pursuing throughout the 1930s. Unlike Loesch's use of the term, the FBI's "Public Enemies" were wanted criminals and fugitives who were already charged with crimes. Among the criminals whom the FBI called "public enemies" were John Dillinger, Baby Face Nelson, Bonnie and Clyde, Pretty Boy Floyd, Machine Gun Kelly, Ma Barker, and Alvin Karpis.

The term was used so extensively during the 1930s that some writers call that period of the FBI's early history the "Public Enemy Era". Dillinger, Floyd, Nelson, and Karpis, in that order, would be deemed "Public Enemy Number 1" from June 1934 to May 1936. Use of the term eventually evolved into the FBI Ten Most Wanted Fugitives list.

The FBI's website describes the bureau's use of the term: "The FBI and the U.S. Department of Justice made use of the term, 'Public Enemy,' in the 1930s, an era in which the term was synonymous with 'fugitive' or 'notorious gangster.'" It was used in speeches, books, press releases, and internal memoranda and remains in usage to this day.

References

External links

 
 Alphonse Capone Documentary - Public Enemy Number One

Crime in the United States
Crime in the United Kingdom
English phrases
Enemy